Buscaglione is an Italian surname. Notable people with the surname include:

Fred Buscaglione (1921–1960), Italian singer and actor
Giovanni Buscaglione (1874–1941), Italian-Colombian architect
Giuseppe Buscaglione (1868–1928), Italian painter

Italian-language surnames